Paleoophiocordyceps coccophagus is an extinct parasitic fungus in the family Ophiocordycipitaceae from Cretaceous-aged Burmese amber.  P. coccophagus' morphology is very similar to the species of Ophiocordyceps.  The only known specimen consists of two whip-like fruiting bodies emerging from the head of a male scale insect of an undescribed species very similar to the extinct species Albicoccus dimai.

References

Cretaceous fungi
Hypocreales genera
Ophiocordycipitaceae
Burmese amber
Fossils of Myanmar